Pyon Rye-yong (born 15 August 2001) is a North Korean artistic gymnast. In 2018, she won the bronze medal in the women's vault event at the 2018 Asian Games in Jakarta, Indonesia. She also won the silver medal in the women's team event.

References

External links 
 

Living people
2001 births
Place of birth missing (living people)
North Korean female artistic gymnasts
Gymnasts at the 2018 Asian Games
Medalists at the 2018 Asian Games
Asian Games silver medalists for North Korea
Asian Games bronze medalists for North Korea
Asian Games medalists in gymnastics
21st-century North Korean women